Ferdinand Elle (1570 in Mechelen – 1637 in Paris), was a French portrait painter.

Biography
According to the RKD he was the teacher of Nicolas Poussin and his son, the painter Louis Ferdinand Elle the Elder. From 1601 he was court painter to Louis XIII. Very few of his works survive.

References

Ferdinand Elle on Artnet

1570 births
1637 deaths
16th-century French painters
French male painters
17th-century French painters
Artists from Mechelen
Court painters
French portrait painters